Péter Odrobéna (born 18 October 1985 in Kazincbarcika) is a Hungarian football player who currently plays for Völsungur.

References 
Player profile at HLSZ 

1985 births
Living people
People from Kazincbarcika
Hungarian footballers
Association football forwards
Kazincbarcikai SC footballers
Vasas SC players
Nyíregyháza Spartacus FC players
Ceglédi VSE footballers
Sportspeople from Borsod-Abaúj-Zemplén County